Thomas Patrick Gill (25 Oct 1858 – 19 January 1931) was a prominent member of the Irish Parliamentary Party in the late 19th and early 20th century and a Member of Parliament in the British House of Commons representing the South Louth constituency unopposed from 1885 to 1892. His uncle Peter was an unsuccessful election candidate in 1868 in County Tipperary.

Life 
Gill was born 25 October 1858, in Ballygraigue, Nenagh, Co. Tipperary, the eldest son of Robert Gill, a civil engineer.  He was educated at Trinity College Dublin and became a journalist, firstly as editor of the Catholic World magazine of New York, and an associate editor of the North American Review, 1883–85.  He married in 1882 to Annie Fennell of Dublin, they had three children.

Gill was a friend and political ally of Charles Stewart Parnell. After the death of Parnell he remained with the Irish Parliamentary Party. He worked with Horace Plunkett in developing the Irish co-operative movement. He was member and honorary secretary to the 1895 Recess Committee which led to the formation of both the Department of Agriculture and Technical Instruction (DATI), forerunner of the Irish Department of Agriculture, and the Vocational Education Committees (VEC). Gill's key work for the Recess committee was research into the state aid to agriculture in France and Denmark. In February 1900, he was appointed Secretary of the new Department of Agriculture and Technical Instruction in Ireland. In 1907, Gill was appointed Chairman of the Departmental Committee on Irish Forestry.  He also served on a number of governmental committees concerning agriculture and agricultural production  He was President of the Irish Technical Instruction Association from 1925 to 1929.

Gill was an uncle of former Workers' Party president and Dublin West TD Tomás Mac Giolla.

References

External links

1858 births
1931 deaths
Politicians from County Tipperary
Members of the Parliament of the United Kingdom for County Louth constituencies (1801–1922)
UK MPs 1885–1886
UK MPs 1886–1892
People from Nenagh
Alumni of Trinity College Dublin
Irish Parliamentary Party MPs